Kerbala District is a district of the Karbala Governorate, Iraq.

Districts of Karbala Province